Pizzaman were a British electronic music duo consisting of John Reid (born 17 December 1963) and Norman Cook (born 16 July 1963).

Biography
Their debut album, "Pizzamania", was released in 1995. The album spawned three singles (with videos directed by Michael Dominic) all of which reached the top forty on the UK Singles Chart. The highest charting of these was "Happiness" (#19), until "Trippin' on Sunshine" performed slightly better (#18) when it was re-released the following year. Despite this success, however, the only follow-up material was the 1996 single "Hello Honky Tonks (Rock Your Body)".

"Sex on the Streets" sampled a part of a 1974 sermon by American evangelist Jack van Impe.

After the group disbanded in 1997, Cook went on to greater success under the name Fatboy Slim.

Discography

Albums

Singles

References

Musical groups established in 1993
Musical groups disestablished in 1997
English house music duos
Male musical duos